Fatehi is a surname. Notable people with the surname include: 

Ahmed Fatehi (born 1993), Qatari footballer
Nazanin Fatehi (born 1987), Iranian woman sentenced to death 
Nora Fatehi (born 1992), Canadian dancer, model, actress, singer, and producer

See also
Fateh (name)